Ralph Creyke (5 September 1849 – 17 April 1908) was an English Liberal politician who sat in the House of Commons from 1880 to 1885.

Creyke was the son of Ralph Creyke of Rawcliffe and Marton Yorkshire and his wife Louisa Frances Croft, daughter of Colonel Croft of Stillington Hall, York. He was educated at Eton College and admitted at Trinity Hall, Cambridge before migrating to Downing College, Cambridge. He was a J.P. for East and West Ridings of York, Middlesex and Westminster and a Deputy Lieutenant for the West Riding.

At the 1880 general election Creyke was elected Member of Parliament for York. He held the seat until 1885. He was High Sheriff of Yorkshire in 1894.

Creyke died at Rawcliffe Hall at the age of 58. He was married and had a family.

References

External links
 

1849 births
1908 deaths
People educated at Eton College
Alumni of Downing College, Cambridge
Deputy Lieutenants of the West Riding of Yorkshire
High Sheriffs of Yorkshire
Liberal Party (UK) MPs for English constituencies
UK MPs 1880–1885